Punta Burica is a small coastal peninsula−reef extending south of the Burica Peninsula on the Pacific border between Costa Rica and Panama.

It is partially in the province of Puntarenas of extreme southeastern Costa Rica, and to the east in Chiriquí Province of Panama.

To the south is the small island of Burica.

References

Peninsulas of Costa Rica
Peninsulas of Panama
Reefs of the Pacific Ocean
Panamanian coasts of the Pacific Ocean
Chiriquí Province